Flottbek may refer to:

Flottbek (Elbe), a river of Hamburg, Germany, tributary of the Elbe
the joint name of
Groß Flottbek, a quarter of Hamburg, Germany
Klein Flottbek, a sub-urban district near Hamburg, Germany